Saracens Mavericks is an English netball team based at the University of Hertfordshire in Hatfield. Their senior team plays in the Netball Superleague. In 2005–06 they were founder members of the league. They were Superleague champions in 2007–08 and 2011. Due to various sponsorship deals and partnership arrangements, the team has played under several different names. Between 2005–06 and 2008–09 they played as Galleria Mavericks. Between 2009–10 and 2017 they played as Hertfordshire Mavericks. During this era they were also referred to as University of Hertfordshire Mavericks. During the 2018 season they played as benecosMavericks. They adopted their current name in 2019 after forming a partnership with the rugby union club, Saracens F.C.

History

Galleria Mavericks
Mavericks were originally established in 2005 as the Netball Superleague franchise for the East of England. Together with Brunel Hurricanes, Celtic Dragons, Leeds Carnegie, Loughborough Lightning, Northern Thunder, Team Bath and Team Northumbria, the Mavericks were founder members of the league. The team was originally sponsored by The Galleria, an outlet store in Hatfield, and as a result were known as the Galleria Mavericks. After playing and losing in the first two Grand Finals, the Mavericks won their first Netball Superleague title after defeating Loughborough Lightning by 43–39 in the 2007–08 Grand Final. Mavericks' Louisa Brownfield was the top scorer in the final. Other members of the team included Amanda Newton and Karen Atkinson.

Hertfordshire Mavericks
In 2009–10 the team was renamed Hertfordshire Mavericks. During this era they were also referred to as University of Hertfordshire Mavericks. In 2011, with a team featuring Louisa Brownfield, Layla Guscoth and Lindsay Keable, Mavericks' won their second Netball Superleague title after defeating Surrey Storm by 57–46 in the Grand Final.

benecosMavericks
In July 2016 Mavericks signed a sponsorship deal with the natural beauty brand, benecos. In September 2017 benecos became Mavericks main sponsor and the team name changed from Hertfordshire Mavericks to benecosMavericks. They subsequently used this name during the 2018 season.

Saracens Mavericks
In January 2019 Mavericks formed a new partnership with the rugby union club, Saracens F.C. This saw the team become the Saracens Mavericks.

Senior finals

Netball Superleague Grand Finals
Between 2006 and 2011, Mavericks played in six successive Netball Superleague Grand Finals.

Fast5 Netball All-Stars Championship

Home venue
Mavericks play their home games at the Herts Sports Village at the University of Hertfordshire. During the 2019 Netball Superleague season, Mavericks also played home games at the Essex Sport Arena at the University of Essex and at the Marshall Arena.

Notable players

2023 squad

Internationals

 Shaunagh Craig
 Michelle Drayne

 Karyn Bailey
 Samantha May

 Keshia Grant
 Joline Henry

 Jhaniele Fowler

 Samantha Wallace

Head coaches
Maggie Jackson was the head coach when Mavericks were Netball Superleague champions in both 2007–08 and 2011. In addition to been named head coach, both Robyn Broughton and Kathryn Ratnapala were given the role of Director of Netball.

Honours
Netball Superleague
Winners: 2007–08, 2011: 2
Runners up: 2005–06, 2006–07, 2008–09, 2009–10, 2015: 5
British Fast5 Netball All-Stars Championship
Runners up: 2018: 1

References

External links
  Saracens Mavericks on Facebook
  Saracens Mavericks on Twitter

 
Netball teams in England
Sport in Hertfordshire
Netball Superleague teams
University of Hertfordshire
Mavericks
2005 establishments in England
Sports clubs established in 2005